Storm spotting is a form of weather spotting in which observers watch for the approach of severe weather, monitor its development and progression, and actively relay their findings to local authorities.

History 
Storm spotting developed in the United States during the early 1940s. A joint project between the military and the weather bureau saw the deployment of trained military and aviation lightning spotters in areas where ammunitions for the war were manufactured. During 1942, a serious tornado struck a key operations center in Oklahoma and another tornado on May 15, 1943 destroyed parts of the Fort Riley military base located in Kansas. After these two events and a string of other tornado outbreaks, spotter networks became commonplace, and it is estimated that there were over 200 networks by 1945. Their mandate had also changed to include reporting all types of active or severe weather; this included giving snow depth and other reports during the winter as well as fire reports in the summer, along with the more typical severe weather reports associated with thunderstorms. However, spotting was still mainly carried out by trained individuals in either the military, aviation, or law enforcement fields of service. It was not until 1947 that volunteer spotting, as it exists today, was born.

After a series of vicious tornado outbreaks hit the state of Texas in 1947, the state placed special emphasis on volunteer spotting, and the local weather offices began to offer basic training classes to the general public. Spotting required the delivery of timely information so that warnings could be issued as quickly as possible, thus civilian landline phone calls and amateur radio operators provided the most efficient and fastest means of communication. While phone lines were reliable to a degree, a common problem was the loss of service when an approaching storm damaged phone lines in its path. This eventually led to amateur radio becoming the predominant mean of communication and resulted in the installation of special amateur radio work zones within local weather offices. Volunteer spotters would come into the local office and run a radio net from within, directly relaying information to meteorologists.

The 1950s saw the deployment of the first dedicated weather radars in the United States, and by this time, civilian spotter networks were commonplace. The new reflectivity-only radars provided meteorologists with basic information and helped identify potentially severe storms, but due to the nature of weather radar, most precipitation was detected at a height of 1 kilometer or more above the ground. Ultimately, the radar cannot see what exactly occurs at the surface of the earth, and storm spotters now correlated ground truthing with radar signatures. This early conventional radar showed intensity of echoes, inferring precipitation intensity and types, and the horizontal and vertical distributions provided information about storm structures and processes. The hook echo was a major method used as an indicator for potential for tornadic activity during the first decades of weather radar. During the 1990s in the US, Doppler weather radar was deployed, providing velocity data on echoes flowing toward and away from the radar location, which enabled inferences about storm rotation, such as mesocyclones, and other dynamics, as well as data on downbursts (and wind shear aloft). The 2010s brought polarization radar in the US, which enabled confirmation of the presence of stronger tornadoes by discerning nonmeteorological echoes colocated with rotation in velocity data, which indicates the presence of lofted debris. However, radar is still limited by factors such as not capturing near surface environment and limitations on spatial and temporal resolution. Therefore, ground truth information remains important.

New spotter technologies and training techniques have been developing since the 1960s. Prior to the 1960s, the vast majority of amateur radio communication relied on AM-modulated signals and the use of simplex. It was not uncommon for spotters to hear the distant net control station and not hear other mobile or base stations which were much closer. After 1960, amateurs adopted the use of FM repeaters which operated in the VHF spectrum. The use of FM repeaters was a huge advancement for storm spotters; spotters could now hear each other regularly. The low noise floor and greatly improved audio quality meant much better signal reception for all stations. By the 1970s, nearly all spotter radio activity consisted of half-duplex FM repeater use. The next major technology to aid spotters was the development of the cell phone in the late 1970s and early 1980s. It was then possible for non-amateur radio operators to directly report severe weather.

Storm spotting became more popular with the public during the late 1980s and early 1990s. During this period, a number of NSSL (National Severe Storms Laboratory) projects were carried out, some of which were documented and broadcast on television in a number of specials. Spotters and their actions were attributed to saving lives as well as aiding university research groups, who would drop sensors such as TOTO in the path of tornadoes and at times fire rocketsondes directly at or very close to tornadoes. At about the same time, early storm chasers were popularized and associated with spotters. It is believed this association is what has led many in the present era to associate storm chasers and storm spotters as carrying out the same actions or having the same goals.

Present 
Technological advances such as the Internet, weather radio, pagers, and cell phones have made spotter activation quick and efficient; however, the basic goal of spotting has remained relatively unchanged to this day. In making these reports, spotters use a specialized set of jargon and slang to describe their observations.

The primary group responsible for storm spotting in the U.S. is known as Skywarn. Many individuals hold Skywarn certification and/or amateur radio licenses. Other spotters are part of organized and highly trained local spotter groups, reporting their observations to the local emergency management office or National Weather Service office responsible for that area. A Skywarn group is either directly or indirectly affiliated or associated with the local weather office, and in many cases other agencies responsible for the well-being of individuals. Today, amateur radio still plays a key role, as most spotters opt to attain their radio licenses; however, cell phones are an ever increasingly popular means to directly relay information, along with other on-line spotter reporting protocols such as The Spotter Network.

Other spotters groups have formed in various countries. Canwarn is the Canadian spotter program run by Environment Canada and similarly the Australian Bureau of Meteorology runs the ASP (Australian Storm Spotters) program in Australia. In the United Kingdom, the TORRO has operated a network of observers since the 1970s. Since the 2000s, about a dozen European countries (including the UK) operate autonomous storm spotting organizations under the auspices of Skywarn Europe.

Controversy 
While there is no question that storm spotting has saved many lives and aided weather agencies greatly, there is concern that storm spotting may actually put individuals in danger. It is a common practice for many spotters to leave their vehicles or places of shelter to better observe, but this also places spotters in a situation where they can be harmed or killed by lightning. Most spotting groups do not recommend that individuals leave their vehicles or places of safety.

Although incidents of near misses and tornado, hail, wind, and lightning impacts occurred, there were no known spotter fatalities caused by weather until May 4, 2007 when a wedge tornado near Greensburg, Kansas killed sheriff's deputy Robert "Tim" Buckman. On May 31, 2013, engineer Tim Samaras, his photographer son Paul, and meteorologist Carl Young, of the TWISTEX project, became the first known storm chaser or meteorologist deaths when a violent tornado struck near El Reno, Oklahoma. Other chasers were also struck and injured and at least one member of the public following the storm also died.

There have also been recent complaints that mobile spotters are a danger to others on the road. One potential danger posed by mobile spotters is distracted driving. Spotters can be distracted while monitoring radar while driving. Another cause for concern is that mobile spotters commonly park their vehicles on the shoulder for a short time while they observe, causing congestion along the roadway. In some areas, parking on the shoulder is only allowed in emergency situations, and it is also believed that spotters pose a distraction to others driving. Most spotter groups do support parking on the shoulder as long as it can be safely done and there is no other alternative. Many spotters have found ways to stay off the roadway altogether by parking in parking lots, driveways (when allowed), or field roads.

The use of amber lights to alert drivers that a spotter vehicle is parked is controversial. Light bars and strobe lights have been becoming increasingly popular with storm spotters and storm chasers since, proponents claim, both groups often travel in less than ideal weather conditions where visibility may be limited. However, in recent years, some spotters and chasers have been seen using red, blue, white, and/or green lighting devices, apparently imitating emergency vehicles. Such actions are illegal in most areas and are highly condemned by both the spotter and storm chaser communities. Said Chuck Doswell, "flashing light bars added to your chase vehicle (similar to those used by law enforcement) may be illegal in some places and their use to imply some sort of official status to your chasing is probably going to get you in trouble". Chris Novy, a trainer of storm spotters throughout the US and a veteran storm chaser, also notes that lights distract and can even unconsciously attract other drivers and that lights may encourage people to drive aggressively or to park in situations they would otherwise avoid and thus increase danger to themselves and to other drivers.

Spotters versus chasers 
A storm spotter is volunteer or a paid county or municipal employee who is spotting as a community service. Most spotters work as part of an organized network and are in communication with their community or organization, which is in turn in communication with the National Weather Service. Some spotters are "mobile" spotters in vehicles, but most spot from fixed, strategic locations around the community or county. The purpose of spotting is to alert community officials and the NWS and assist them in warning the public. Schools, hospitals, and other facilities are encouraged to have spotters to alert people in their care of impending severe weather.

Storm chasing involves following a developing thunderstorm to view or photograph severe weather phenomena. Chasing may be done for educational purposes or scientific research but is mostly done for personal fulfillment.

See also 
 Citizen Weather Observer Program (CWOP)
 Convective storm detection
 Local storm report

References

External links 
 Canwarn
 U.S. Skywarn homepage
 Australian Storm Spotters' Guide (Australian BOM)
 Storm Spotting and Public Awareness Since the First Tornado Forecasts of 1948 (Doswell, et al.)

Storm chasing
Emergency communication
Disaster preparedness in the United States
National Weather Service
Meteorological data and networks